Imran Khan (born 28 May 1984) is a Dutch-Pakistani  singer, songwriter. Khan sings in Punjabi and English. He first reached stardom in 2007 after the release of his first single "Ni Nachleh". Khan was signed to Prestige Records in late 2007, and released the single "Ni Nachleh" on the label. His second single, "Amplifier", was released on 13 July 2009. As of July 2022, his song "Satisfya" is his most viewed video with over 830 million views on YouTube. His debut 15-track album, Unforgettable, was released on 27 July 2009 via Prestige Records, produced by Eren E.

Personal life
Khan was born in The Hague to a Pakistani Punjabi Muslim Jat family. Khan's family originally hails from Gujranwala, Punjab, Pakistan. He has two brothers and one sister. He is unmarried.

Career
Khan started his music career in his late teens. After Prestige Records released his debut single Ni Nachleh, he continued his career by performing in several countries.

Khan's first released single, "Amplifier", was produced by Eren E, was released on 12 July 2009. It received 2 million views on YouTube on it first week of release and currently has 505 million views and counting on YouTube. His second single, "Bewafa," was produced by Hakan Ozan and was released on 30 August 2009; as of May 2022, its music video had been viewed more than 300 million times on YouTube.

In July 2009, Khan released his debut album, Unforgettable. It includes the singles "Amplifier", "Bewafa", and a remix of his first single, "Ni Nachleh". It was nominated for Best Album at the 2010 UK Asian Music Awards but did not win.

In 2011, Khan departed from Prestige Records to start his own label, later known as IK Records.  Khan released the single "Satisfya" on 9 May 2013. Unlike his previous singles, it was released by IK Records. It was produced by his "Amplifier" music producer, Eren E. The music video shows Khan driving a yellow Lamborghini Aventador and sitting with a cheetah. The video was directed by David Zennie, and as of November 2022, it has 810+ million views.

Khan made his Bollywood debut as a singer for the Hindi film Tevar, which was released on 9 January 2015. As of 2016 the song had over more than 2 million hits.

Khan released a single titled "Imaginary" on 8 June 2015, produced by Eren E. The single was released on his own record label, IK Records. Khan shot the video with David Zennie at Akon's house in Los Angeles. "Imaginary"'s official music video received 6 million views within a month of its release and currently has 91 million+ views on YouTube. Khan came out with another song, "Hattrick", which received 2 million views in a month and as of late 2021 had 32 million+ views.

On 28 September 2018, Khan released a new single, "Knightridah". In 2021, he released two singles, "M.O.B." on 14 May, featuring J.J. Esko; and "They Don't Like It" on 28 September.  On February 2, 2022, Khan released "On My Way" (featuring Meez).  As of November 2022, his YouTube channel has accumulated over 2 billion views. 

Khan is due to release a new album in 2023, with a single from it coming out early in the year.

Discography

Albums

Unforgettable (2009)
Unforgettable is Khan's debut album, released on 27 July 2009 via Prestige Records. It was produced by Eren E and Hakan Ozan. It contains 15 tracks.

The album was nominated for the "Best Album" award at the UK Asian Music Awards 2010 and won "Best Album" at the 2010 Brit Asia TV Music Awards.

Singles discography

As lead artist

Remixes
 2007 "Ni Nachleh" (feat. MC Spyder) [Eren E. Electro Remix]
 2007 "Ni na Nachleh" (feat. MC Spyder) [Eren E. Electro Extended Mix]
 2007 "Ni Nachleh" (Eren E. Disco Remix)
 2007 "Ni Nachleh" (Eren E. Disco Dub Mix)
 "Aaja We Mahiya" (Infidel Mix)
 "Gora Gora Rang" (Remix)
 "Scream" (2020 Hexa Remix)

Awards and nominations
Won "Best Album" at the 2010 Brit Asia TV Music Awards for Unforgettable
Nominated for four awards at the 2010 UK Asian Music Awards: "Best Album", "Best Video" for "Amplifier", "Best Male Act" and "Best Desi Act", winning "Best Desi Act"
Won "Male Musical Artist of the Year" at the 2010 Anokhi Magazine Awards
Won "Best Urban Asian Single" at the 2013 Brit Asia TV Music Awards for "Satisfya"
Won three awards in 2015 from Pakistani Music and Media Awards (PMMA) for best songwriter, best video (for "Imaginary") and best song (for "Imaginary")
Won three awards at the 2015 Brit Asia TV Music Awards: "Best Urban Asian Act", "Best Music Video" for "Imaginary" and "Best UK Single" for "Imaginary"

Tours
 Imran Khan – Takeover Tour USA (2011)
 Imran Khan – Australia & New Zealand Tour (2011)
 Imran Khan- Unforgettable Tour India (2022)

References

External links
 
  
 Imran Khan at Instagram 
 Imran Khan at Facebook 
 Imran Khan at Twitter 

1984 births
21st-century Dutch male singers
21st-century Dutch singers
Dancehall musicians
Dutch hip hop musicians
Dutch pop singers
Dutch singer-songwriters
Hip hop singers
Living people
Musicians from The Hague
Punjabi-language singers 
Dutch people of Pakistani descent 
Dutch people of Punjabi descent 
Punjabi rappers